Sarah Maldoror (19 July 1929 − 13 April 2020) was a French filmmaker of French West Indies  descent. She is best known for her feature film Sambizanga (1972) on the 1961–1974 war in Angola.

Early life and education
Born Sarah Ducados in 1929 in Condom, Gers, the daughter of emigrants from Guadeloupe, she chose her artist's name in remembrance of Les Chants de Maldoror by Lautréamont.

She attended a drama school in Paris. Together with her husband, Angolan nationalist Mário Pinto de Andrade, she received a scholarship and studied film with Mark Donskoi in Moscow in 1961–62 where she met Ousmane Sembène. (Sarah and Mário would go on to have two daughters, Henda Ducados Pinto de Andrade and Annouchka de Andrade.)

Career
After her studies, Maldoror, worked as an assistant on Gillo Pontecorvo's acclaimed film, The Battle of Algiers (1966). She also worked as an assistant to Algerian director Ahmed Lallem.

Maldoror's short film, Monangambee (1968), was set in Angola, based on a story by Angolan writer José Luandino Vieira. The title of this 17-minute film, Monangambée, refers to the call used by Angolan anti-colonial activists to signal a village meeting. The film was shot with amateur actors in Algeria. It tells the story of a poor woman who visits her husband, who is imprisoned in the city of Luanda. The film was selected for the Director's Fortnight at Cannes in 1971, representing Angola.

Her first feature film, Sambizanga (1972), was also based on a story by Vieira (A vida verdadeira de Domingos Xavier), and is set in 1961 at the onset of the Angolan War of Independence. Guardian film writer Mark Cousins included Sambizanga in a 2012 list of the ten best African films, calling it "as bold, as well-lit as Caravaggio paintings".

Maldoror is one of the first women to direct a feature film in Africa; therefore, her work is often included in studies of the role of African women in African cinema.

Maldoror died on 13 April 2020, at the age of 90, from COVID-19 during the COVID-19 pandemic in France.

Awards
 Maldoror won a Tanit d'or at the 1972 Carthage Film Festival
 Maldoror received the National Order of Merit (France) from the Government of France

Filmography
Monangambé, 1968
Des fusils pour Banta (Guns for Banta), 1970
Carnaval en Guinée-Bissau (Carnival in Guinea-Bissau), 1971
Sambizanga, 1972
Un carneval dans le Sahel (Carnival in Sahel), 1977
Folgo, Ile de Feu
Et les chiens se taisaient (And the dogs kept silent)
Un homme, une terre (A man, a country)
La Basilique de Saint-Denis
Un dessert pour Constance, 1983
Le cimetière du Père Lachaise
Miro
Lauren
Robert Lapoujade, peintre
Toto Bissainthe, Chanteuse
René Depestre, poète
L'hôpital de Leningrad, 1983
La littérature tunisienne de la Bibliothèque nationale
Un sénégalias en Normandie
Robert Doisneau, photographe
Le racisme au quotidien (Daily life racism), 1983
Le passager du Tassili (The Tassili passenger), 1987
Aimé Césaire, le masque des mots (Aimé Césaire, word as masks), 1986
Emmanuel Ungaro, couturier
Louis Aragon – Un masque à Paris
Vlady, peintre
Léon G. Damas, 1995
L'enfant-cinéma, 1997
La tribu du bois de l'é (In the time of people)

Documentary about Sarah Maldoror
Sarah Maldoror ou la nostalgie de l’utopie by Anne Laure Folly, France /Togo, 1998.

See also
Women's Cinema

References

External links

1929 births
2020 deaths
French film directors
French women film directors
French people of Guadeloupean descent
Knights of the Ordre national du Mérite
Deaths from the COVID-19 pandemic in France
People from Gers